"Watch Out" is a single by Alex Gaudino featuring Shèna, released on 28 January 2008. It is the third single released from his debut album My Destination. The second release topically coincided with UEFA Euro 2008, as the music video features a "video-game"  football match played by raunchy women in spandex shorts/tops. The song contains a SCORCCiO replayed sample of Pigbag's "Papa's Got a Brand New Pigbag", produced by Mark Summers while Shèna's vocals play a considerable part in track.

Music video
The music video starts with Alex Gaudino and his friend playing a virtual game of football (soccer) on an unknown video game console. The two men select a player type (all are female); Gaudino chooses blue tops and his friend plays Team Diablo in white tops, and they play in the Gaudino Arena. The game starts with a shot between one of the player's legs and doors then open behind her. They enter the arena wearing tight Lycra tops and shorts which are both short and revealing. The two teams start doing exercises including star jumps, stretching and bending of the legs, with some angles showing close-ups of buttocks and cleavage. The game eventually kicks off. Team Gaudino scores a goal, and later tackles team Diablo causing one girl to trip. A nurse is called out by the referee and she uses a "magic sponge" which miraculously heals the bruise. The play continues and team Diablo scores a goal. A player from team Gaudino then pulls on the shorts of a Diablo player, which causes the referee to give Gaudino a foul and Diablo gets a free kick. Team Diablo scores another goal and the game ends. Diablo then shakes hands with Alex Gaudino at the end of the video.
The soccer players are played by Amy Perfect and Sophie Burles.

Track listings
12-inch maxi (Rise)
 Watch Out (Extended Mix) – 7:14
 Watch Out (Jason Rooney Remix) – 7:41
 Watch Out (Nari & Milani Remix) – 6:47
 Watch Out (Robbie Rivera Remix) – 7:18

CD-maxi (Ministry Of Sound)
 Watch Out (Radio Edit) – 2:59
 Watch Out (Extended Mix) – 7:16
 Watch Out (Nari & Milani Remix) – 6:49
 Watch Out (Jason Rooney Remix) – 7:41

CD-single (Spinnin')
 Watch Out (UK Radio Edit) – 2:56
 Watch Out (Mac Project Remix) – 6:24
 Watch Out (Nari & Milani Remix) – 6:47
 Watch Out (Robbie Rivera Remix) – 7:19
 Watch Out (UK Club Mix) – 7:12

Credits and personnel
Lead vocals – Tracey Elizabeth McSween, a.k.a. Shèna
Lyrics – Jerma (uncredited),  Chip Carpenter, James Johnstone, Simon Underwood, Chris Lee, Roger Freeman, Ollie Moore, Chris Hamlin
Producer – Alex Gaudino

Charts

Weekly charts

Year-end charts

References

External links
 Music video
 Positions from Acharts.us

2008 singles
2008 songs
Alex Gaudino songs